Norrköpings IF Bosna is a Swedish football club located in Norrköping.

Background
Norrköpings IF Bosna is a club with roots with Bosnia. The club currently plays in Division 4 Östergötland Östra which is the sixth tier of Swedish football. They play their home matches at the Idrottsparken Södra in Norrköping.

The club is affiliated to Östergötlands Fotbollförbund.

Season to season

Footnotes

External links
 Norrköpings IF Bosna – Official website
 Norrköpings IF Bosna on Facebook

Football clubs in Östergötland County
Association football clubs established in 1991
1991 establishments in Sweden
Diaspora football clubs in Sweden